Augustine Cheong Myong-jo (May 25, 1935 – June 1, 2007) was a Korean prelate of the Roman Catholic Church. He was Bishop of Busan from 1999 to 2007, having previously served as head of the Military Ordinariate of Korea from 1989 to 1998.

1935 births
2007 deaths
South Korean Roman Catholic bishops
Korean military chaplains
Roman Catholic bishops of Busan
People from Geoje